Kate Locke is one of six pen names of a Canadian-born author, born in 1971, who also goes by the names Kate Cross, Kady Cross, Kathryn Smith, Kate Kessler and Kate McLaughlin depending on the genre she writes.

Smith's earliest novels were paranormal romances in an historical setting, written under the name Kathryn Smith. She then turned to writing steampunk for young adults as Kady Cross and steampunk romances as Kate Cross. The Immortal Empire series, set in an alternate steampunk London, was published as Kate Locke and categorised as urban fantasy. It is unclear which, if any, is her 'real' name (maiden or married), and which are fictional, however the copyright statement in all her books is assigned to Kathryn Smith.

She and her husband, Steve (no last name given), currently live in Connecticut.

Books

as Kathryn Smith 

 Elusive Passion (2001)
 A Game of Scandal (2002)
 The MacLaughlins Series
 Anna and the Duke (2002)
 Emily and the Scot (2002)
 Into Temptation (2003)
 In the Night (2003)
 For the First Time (2003)
 In Your Arms Again (2004)
 Still in my Heart (2005)
 A Seductive Offer (2009)
 When Seducing a Duke (2009)
 When Marrying a Scoundrel (2010)
 When Tempting a Rogue (2011)
Brotherhood of the Blood
 Be Mine Tonight (2006)
 Night of the Huntress (2007)
 Taken by the Night (2007)
 Let the Night Begin (2008)
 Night After Night (2009)
Nightmare Chronicles
 Before I Wake (2008)
 Dark Side of Dawn (2009)

as Kady Cross 
 The Strange Case of Finley Jayne (2011)
The Steampunk Chronicles
The Girl in the Steel Corset (2012)
The Girl in the Clockwork Collar (2013)
The Girl with the Iron Touch (2013)
The Girl with the Windup Heart (2014)
 The Dark Discovery of Jack Dandy (2013)
 The Wild Adventures of Jasper Renn (2013)

as Kate Cross 
The Clockwork Agents
Heart of Brass (2012)
Touch of Steel (2012)
Breath of Iron (2013)

as Kate Locke 
The Immortal Empire
 God Save the Queen (2012)
 The Queen is Dead (2013)
 Long Live the Queen (2013)

as Kate Kessler 
Audrey Harte Series
 It Takes One (2016)
 Two can play (2016)
 Three Strikes (2017)
Dead Ringer (2018)

as Kate McLaughlin 

 What Unbreakable Looks Like (2020)
 Daughter (2022)

References

External links
 
  under that name, and as many under five linked pseudonyms
 

Canadian historical novelists
Canadian romantic fiction writers
Urban fantasy writers
Canadian fantasy writers
Canadian women novelists
Living people
1971 births
Pseudonymous women writers
Canadian women short story writers
Women science fiction and fantasy writers
Women romantic fiction writers
20th-century Canadian short story writers
21st-century Canadian short story writers
21st-century Canadian women writers
20th-century Canadian women writers
Women historical novelists
20th-century pseudonymous writers
21st-century pseudonymous writers